Amylie Boisclair (born 1982) is a Canadian singer-songwriter from Quebec. She is most noted for her 2012 album Le Royaume, which was a shortlisted Juno Award nominee for Francophone Album of the Year at the Juno Awards of 2013.

Originally from Mascouche, Boisclair had her first experience in music when she played the role of Sandy in a production of Grease. She released her debut album Jusqu'aux oreilles in 2008, and followed up with Le Royaume in 2012. Her third album, Les Éclats, was released in 2016.

She has also performed in the group Louve, with Marie-Pierre Arthur, Ariane Moffatt, Salomé Leclerc and Laurence Lafond-Beaulne.

References

External links

Canadian women pop singers
Canadian women folk singers
Singers from Quebec
French-language singers of Canada
French Quebecers
People from Mascouche
Living people
Canadian folk rock musicians
Canadian folk singer-songwriters
Canadian women singer-songwriters
1982 births